The Ugrós is an athletic Hungarian couples' jumping dance in  meter with an off-beat accent similar to polkas or hasaposerviko. Its origins lay in weapon dances from the Middle Ages.

Dunántúli Ugros 
Dunántúli Ugros is a couples' folk dance from Transdanubia (Dunántúl in Hungarian), the western part of Hungary.

See also
 Hopak
 Hasapiko
 Yalli

References

Hungarian styles of music
Hungarian dances